Gopi or Gopika in Hinduism are worshipped as the consorts and devotees of Krishna within the Vaishnavism and Krishnaism traditions for their unconditional love and devotion (Bhakti) to god Krishna as described in the Sanskrit scriptures like Bhagavata Purana and other Puranic literature. Gopis are often considered as the expansion of goddess Radha, the chief consort of Krishna. The Raslila of gopis with Krishna has inspired various traditional performance art forms and literatures.

According to Indian philosopher, Jiva Goswami, gopis are considered as the eternal beloved and manifestation of the internal spiritual potency of Krishna. Among the gopis, Radha is the chief gopi and is the personification of bliss potency (hladini shakti) of Krishna. She alone manifest the stage of "Mahabhav" or supreme love for Krishna and holds a place of particularly high reverence and importance in a number of religious traditions.

Etymology 
Gopi (गोपी) is a Sanskrit word originating from the word Gopa. In Hinduism, the name Gopika or Gopi is especially used to refer the milkmaids of Braj region.

Prominent gopis
The prominent gopis of Vrindavan are total 108 in numbers. They share the eternal intimate friendship with Radha Krishna. No one can equal or exceed the love they bear for the divine couple. Out of 108 gopis, the primary eight gopis are considered as the foremost of Krishna's devotees after goddess Radharani who is considered as the chief of gopis. Their names are as follows: 
 Radha (Chief gopi, Krishna's favourite)
Lalita 
 Vishakha 
 Champakalata 
 Chitra 
 Tungavidya 
 Indulekha 
 Rangadevi 
 Sudevi 
All the eight primary gopis are together called as the Ashtasakhis (eight friends) of Radha and Krishna.

Unconditional love

According to Hindu Vaishnava theology, the stories concerning the gopis are said to exemplify Suddha-bhakti which is described as 'the highest form of unconditional love for God (Krishna). Their spontaneous and unwavering devotion is described in depth in the later chapters of the Bhagavata Purana, within Krishna's Vrindavan pastimes and also in the stories of the sage Uddhava.

Gallery

See also 
Raslila
Chaitanya Mahaprabhu
Gita Govinda

References

External links 

The Residents of Eternal Vrindavana
The Eight Main Gopis (Ashtasakhi)
Deity Gallery: Radha-Madhava and the Eight Gopis
Diagram of the Yoga Pitha in Vrindavana
Srimati Radharani and other Personalities
 Shree Radha Raasbihiari Ashtasakhi Temple, Vrindavan

People related to Krishna
Culture of Uttar Pradesh
Consorts of Krishna
Regional Hindu goddesses
Hindu given names